Pechman or Pechmann is a surname of German origin. Notable persons with that name include:

Joseph A. Pechman (1918–1989), American economist
Hans von Pechmann (1850–1902), German chemist
Marsha J. Pechman (born 1951), American judge
Matthias Pechmann, East German swimmer

German-language surnames